Friedrich Wurzer was an Italian luger who competed in the early 1970s. A natural track luger, he won a bronze medal in the men's doubles event at the 1973 FIL European Luge Natural Track Championships in Taisten, Italy.

References

Year of birth missing
Possibly living people
Missing middle or first names
Sportspeople from Südtirol
Italian male lugers